The Pasir Gudang Corporation Stadium (Malay: Stadium Perbadanan Pasir Gudang) is a multi-use stadium in Pasir Gudang, Johor Bahru District, Johor, Malaysia. It has both an indoor stadium and an outdoor stadium within its compound.

The outdoor stadium can hold a maximum of 15,000 people and is currently used mostly for football matches, serving as the home stadium to Johor Darul Ta'zim II F.C. in the Malaysia Premier League.

See also
 Sport in Malaysia

References

Football venues in Malaysia
Athletics (track and field) venues in Malaysia
Indoor arenas in Malaysia
Multi-purpose stadiums in Malaysia
Pasir Gudang
Sports venues in Johor
Singapore Premier League venues